Babia quadriguttata, the eastern babia, is a species of case-bearing leaf beetle in the family Chrysomelidae. It is found in North America.

Subspecies
These four subspecies belong to the species Babia quadriguttata:
 Babia quadriguttata magnasmokiae Moldenke, 1970
 Babia quadriguttata pulla Lacordaire, 1848
 Babia quadriguttata quadriguttata (Olivier, 1791)
 Babia quadriguttata tenuis Schaeffer

References

Further reading

External links

 

Clytrini
Articles created by Qbugbot
Beetles described in 1791